Oranmore ( or Úarán Mór) is a town near the city of Galway in County Galway, Ireland. It is also the name of the civil parish and Roman Catholic parish in which the town lies.

Etymology
Oranmore is the anglicisation of Uarán Mór or Órán Mór. The first written record of Oranmore is in the Annals of the Four Masters. It was originally called Fuarán Mór, meaning "great spring" in Irish. The name refers to a spring to the northwest of the main village.

History

Pre-history 

Evidence of prehistoric settlement in the Oranmore Parish area include a number of fulacht fiadh (at Frenchfort townland), ringforts (Rinn townland) and a megalithic structure (at Garraun South townland). Griffith's Valuation, a land survey completed in 1857, shows several such structures (sometimes colloquially and collectively known as fairy forts) in the area.

Medieval church ruins 
The ruin of a medieval Roman Catholic church is one of the oldest buildings in Oranmore town. Its northern wall forms part of the enclosure which encompasses the church and its graveyard. The church is believed to date to the 13th century. If true, this means it was built no later than one and half century's after the initial Anglo-Norman Invasion of 1169 AD.

The existing remains measure approximately 32 feet by 72 feet, however, there is evidence that the church was larger at one time. Some grave markers in the adjoining cemetery have no discernible name or date. Other graves have been marked with pieces of the fallen church walls. The oldest grave stone, with a discernible date inscription, is a Celtic cross dated 1661. It is no longer in its original location, but is instead lying on top of another, newer stone slab.

There is a gated section within the graveyard set aside for the Presentation Sisters, an order of teaching sisters who established a convent in Oranmore in 1861. Some interments occurred within the ruined walls of the actual church.

Oranmore Castle 

Oranmore Castle is a tower house which was originally associated with the Norman Clanricarde family. It was built around the 15th century, reputedly on the site of an earlier structure.

St Mary's church 

Completed in 1803, St Mary's is a large church building with a bell-cote above the front door and an elaborate ceiling. In 1972, it was replaced as the local parish church with the newer, larger Church of the Immaculate Conception.  St Mary's was deconsecrated and converted to become the town's public library. Its carved baptismal font was moved to the new church, but the graveyard was left intact.

Economy
The focus of industry has shifted from dairy agriculture to tourism, manufacturing and logistics. Oranmore has four hotels and 23 restaurants.

Railways
Oranmore railway station opened on 1 August 1851, closed on 17 June 1963. A new station was built 1.4 km west of the original station and was opened on 28 July 2013. Trains connect directly with Galway, Athenry, Athlone, Portarlington, Kildare and Dublin Heuston, as well as on the Western Rail Corridor to Ennis and Limerick.

Education
Oranmore has three primary schools, Scoil Iosaif Naofa, Scoil Mhuire and Gaelscoil de hÍde. Calasanctius College, founded in 1861 by the Presentation Sisters, is the secondary school in Oranmore.

Transport
Oranmore town is near the old N6 Galway to Dublin road and the old N18 from Galway to Limerick. The M6 Motorway connects to the existing road at Doughiska, as well as connecting with the M18 at Glenascaul. The former N6 leading into Oranmore has been reclassified as the R338 regional road. The M18 motorway was officially opened on 27 September 2017 and connects to the M6 at Rathmorrissey at a three-level interchange. This road runs close to Oranmore but does not connect directly to it, and instead, motorists have to access it using the R381 at Kiltiernan or the M6 at Rathmorrissey.

Bus Éireann, Citylink, and Nestor Bus services through Oranmore serve Galway, Dublin, Cork, and Dublin and Shannon Airports.

Oranmore aerodrome was a Royal Air Force base in World War I. It later became a civil airfield serving the city of Galway.

Sport
Oranmore-Maree GAA is the local GAA club, and has won a number county titles across several age groups, including a Galway Senior Hurling Championship title in 1933 and All-Ireland Intermediate Club Hurling Championship title in 2019. The club fields teams in Gaelic football, hurling and camogie. Naomh Mhuire Ladies Football Club, Oranmore Maree fields ladies' Gaelic football teams from under-10 to minor and junior.

Galway Bay Golf Resort is based in Renvile, Oranmore, and has been named best golf resort in Connacht 10 times.

Maree/Oranmore Soccer Club was founded in 1988. Other clubs in the area include the Oranmore Badminton Club, Maree Badminton Club, Maree Basketball Club, Oranmore Judo Club and Galway Bay Sailing Club. The latter is based in Renville, Oranmore. Junior "Park Run" events are run on Sunday mornings.

People

 Joseph Henry Blake, nobleman and socialist, grew up on a nearby estate in Treanlaur, Maree.
Thomas Nicholas Redington, Irish politician, born here.
Joe Howley, Irishman involved in the struggle for Irish Independence, was killed by the British in December 1920. A statue stands in Oranmore in his honour.
Bill King, round-the-world sailor and owner of Oranmore Castle.
Célestin Lainé, leader of the Bezen Perrot lived there after World War II
Aaron Connolly, professional Premier League footballer
Nicola Coughlan, Irish actress starring as Clare in Derry Girls and Penelope in Bridgerton
Niall Burke, Galway hurler

See also
 List of towns and villages in Ireland

References

External links

 Oranmore community page

Towns and villages in County Galway